Durval Discos is a 2002 Brazilian film by Anna Muylaert shot in Pinheiros, a borough of São Paulo. The film is noticeable for its soundtrack made up of 1970s Brazilian music that reflects the protagonist's taste, as he is himself a hippie, as well as André Abujamra's original score, more present in the film's second, darker half. The shift of mood from the first part to the second was advertised as life's A and B sides, a reference to the film's homage to LPs.

Abujamra makes a small comical appearance as the character Fat Marley and Brazilian rock singer Rita Lee also has a brief cameo as an eccentric customer who forgets to take the vinyl she has just bought. Some of the records shown in the store include Caetano Veloso's white, signed 1969 album and Tim Maia's Racional, a two-volume album highly sought in Brazil due to its cult status.

Plot
In the late 1990s, Durval (Ary França) is a middle-aged man who owns a record store in the first floor of his overbearing mother's (Etty Fraser) house. A typical hippie, Durval refuses to sell CDs despite the decline in customers. He notices his mother is not giving as much attention to cooking and house chores as she once did, and suggests they hire a maid, a task which is tricky since they are only willing to pay 100 reais. A young woman (Letícia Sabatella) finally appears willing to take on the job, but disappears after one day. They soon discover that she left a little girl called Kiki and a note asking them to take care of her for a few days. Durval and his mother become attached to Kiki, but soon discover she is actually the daughter of a wealthy family from the countryside who has been kidnapped.

Cast
 Ary França as Durval
 Etty Fraser as Carmita
 Marisa Orth as Elisabeth
 Letícia Sabatella as Célia
 Rita Lee as Tia Julieta
 Isabela Guasco as Kiki
 André Abujamra as Fat Marley
 Theo Werneck as DJ Theo
 Regina Remencius as Mãe de Kiki
 Marcelo Mansfield as salesman

Soundtrack 
 Mestre Jonas - Os Mulheres Negras
 Que Maravilha - Jorge Ben
 Maracatu Atômico - Gilberto Gil
 Madalena - Elis Regina
 Irene - Caetano Veloso
 Ovelha Negra - Rita Lee
 Back in Bahia - Gilberto Gil
 Alfômega - Caetano Veloso
 Besta É Tu - Novos Baianos
 Xica da Silva - Jorge Ben
 London, London - Gal Costa
 Pérola Negra - Luiz Melodia
 Mestre Jonas - Sá, Rodrix & Guarabyra

Tim Maia's "Imunização Racional (Que Beleza)" does not appear in the soundtrack album, but is present in the film.

The song "Mestre Jonas", present in the film's opening sequence, relates to the film's story through its lyrics. In the song, Jonas lives inside a whale, which acts as a protection shell (in an allusion to the biblical story of Jonah). Similarly, Durval refuses to move on with the times or move out of his mother's house.

References

External links 
 

2002 comedy films
2002 films
Brazilian comedy films
Films directed by Anna Muylaert
Films shot in São Paulo
2002 directorial debut films
2000s Portuguese-language films